Wind power in Utah is in the early stages of development. As of 2016 the state had 391 MW of wind generation capacity, responsible for 2.6% of in-state electricity generation. Wind thus plays a small role in the state's renewable portfolio standard goals.

A 2009 Utah Renewable Energy Zone Taskforce estimated that the state could produce over 9,000 megawatts of wind power. As about 80% of Utah’s population is concentrated along the foot of the Wasatch Front mountain range, reliable and predictable canyon winds offer opportunities for wind power generation and efficient wind energy distribution without long-distance transmission.

Utah Power, now PacifiCorp, launched the Blue Sky Program in 2000 to encourage users to purchase imported wind power, with the option of purchasing 100-kilowatt hour (kWh) "blocks" of renewable energy for a monthly fee through their electricity bills. In 2003, radio station KZMU in southeast Utah began operating solely on wind power. Kinkos also participates.
PacifiCorp, the major provider in Utah, imports much of its renewable energy into the state and does not intend to build instate facilities before at least 2024.

Wind farms

The first utility-scale wind farm was built at Spanish Fork in 2008.

The 306 MW Milford Wind Corridor Project has been the largest wind farm in Utah since its completion in 2011.

Statistics 

Source:

See also
 Solar power in Utah
 Wind power in the United States
 List of wind farms

References

External links
 Bureau of Land Management Utah